Elector may refer to:
 Prince-elector or elector, a member of the electoral college of the Holy Roman Empire, having the function of electing the Holy Roman Emperors
 Elector, a member of an electoral college
 Confederate elector, a member of the Electoral College (Confederate States), which elected the President Jefferson Davis, and Vice President Alexander H. Stephens
 U.S. presidential and vice presidential elector, a member of the Electoral College (United States), which formally chooses the president and vice president of the United States
 Elector, a science fiction novella by Charles Stross, incorporated into Accelerando (novel)

See also
 Electoral college (disambiguation)
 Electorate (disambiguation)